Orangeville is an unincorporated community in Orangeville Township, Orange County, in the U.S. state of Indiana.

History
Orangeville was laid out in 1849. The community took its name from Orange County. A post office was established at Orangeville in 1849, and remained in operation until it was discontinued in 1907.

Geography

References

Unincorporated communities in Indiana
Unincorporated communities in Orange County, Indiana